Psychological Science in the Public Interest (PSPI) is a triannual peer-reviewed open access academic journal covering issues in psychology of interest to the public at large. It is published by SAGE Publications on behalf of the Association for Psychological Science. Editor-in-chief Valerie F. Reyna (Cornell University) is finishing up her term, soon to be followed by Nora S. Newcombe (Temple University).

Past editors 
Past editors-in-chief include Morton Ann Gernsbacher (University of Wisconsin–Madison), Stephen J. Ceci (Cornell University), and Robert A. Bjork (University of California, Los Angeles).

Abstracting and indexing 
The journal is abstracted and indexed in:

According to the Journal Citation Reports, the journal has a 2017 impact factor of 21.286, ranking it third for impact factor in the Psychology, Multidisciplinary Category.

References

External links 
 

SAGE Publishing academic journals
English-language journals
Psychology journals
Triannual journals
Publications established in 2000
Association for Psychological Science academic journals